Lizzie Yu Der Ling (8 June 188122 November 1944), better known as "Princess" Der Ling, and also known as Elisabeth Antoinette White after her marriage to Thaddeus C. White, was a Hanjun bannerwoman, the daughter of  and Louisa Pierson, the half-Chinese daughter of a Boston merchant working in Shanghai. Although not a member of the Qing royal family, Der Ling was given the title of "" while serving as the first lady-in-waiting for Empress Dowager Cixi. She was a writer of several memoirs, books, and magazine articles.

Early life

Der Ling's father Yü Keng was a member of the Hanjun Plain White Banner Corps, and according to his daughter he was a Lord. This is of some doubt. After serving as Chinese minister to Japan, he was appointed minister to the French Third Republic for four years in 1899. He was known for his progressive, reformist views; for his determination to educate his children, including the girls, in western schools, which was highly unusual in their generation; and for his unvarying support of the Empress Dowager Cixi. In 1905, Yü Keng died in Shanghai. According to Der Ling's biographer, Der Ling's mother, Louisa Pierson, was the daughter of a Boston-born American and a Chinese woman. However, in the book, whatever her background, she is repeatedly referred to by other people as a Manchu.

Yü Keng's daughters Der Ling and Roung Ling (1882–1973, the future Madame Dan Pao-tchao of Peking) received a western education, learning French and English, and studying dance in Paris with Isadora Duncan.

Der Ling was a Catholic baptised by the French bishop Alphonse Favier. While a young girl, she travelled with her father to Rome, and received papal blessing by the hand of Pope Leo XIII during a private meeting.

Lady-in-waiting and later life
Upon their return to China, Der Ling became the first lady-in-waiting to the Empress Dowager Cixi, as well as interpreting for her when she received foreign visitors. Der Ling stayed at court until March 1905. In 1907, Der Ling married Thaddeus C. White, an American. Der Ling had a brother, John Yu Shuinling, who studied photography in France and later took the only photographs of Empress Dowager Cixi still in existence.

Using the title of Princess, which would create controversy for her in both China and the United States in the future, Der Ling wrote of her experiences in court in her memoir Two Years in the Forbidden City, which was published in 1911. She states in her book that the status of Princess, which the Empress Dowager had given her, was valid only within the palace. As the Guangxu Emperor, who was under a form of house arrest, never confirmed the title, it was not valid in the outside world. Two Years provides unique insights into life at the Manchu court and the character of the Empress Dowager, a world that ended abruptly with the 1911 Revolution that overthrew the Manchu or Qing dynasty. Der Ling continued to write and published seven more books.

Der Ling was not a member of the Qing royal family. Although Der Ling claimed to be an ethnic Manchu, her father Yü Keng was actually a Han Chinese Bannerman and not part of the ethnic Manchu Banners. Her father was not royal but was a bannerman, just as Der Ling claimed she was a Manchu while she was actually a Chinese Bannerwoman.

Death
Der Ling died in Berkeley, California, as a result of being struck by a truck while crossing an intersection. She had recently taught Chinese at University of California, Berkeley.

Memoirs and writings

After Cixi's death in 1908, Der Ling professed to be so angered by what she saw as false portraits of Cixi appearing in books and periodicals that she wrote her own account of serving "Old Buddha", which she called "Two Years in the Forbidden City". This book appeared in 1911, just before the fall of the Qing dynasty, and was a popular success.

In this book, Cixi is not the monster of depravity depicted in the popular press and in the second and third hand accounts left by foreigners who had lived in Beijing, but an aging woman who loved beautiful things, had many regrets about the past and the way she had dealt with the many crises of her long reign, and apparently trusted Der Ling enough to share many memories and opinions with her.

Der Ling would go on to write seven more books about this relatively brief period in her youth when she had been close to the heart of declining imperial Chinese power, and sharing this personal history and her habit of promoting herself and her writings caused most of her family to turn against her. All of this has made it difficult to assess Der Ling's contribution to late Qing historiography. But the fact remains that she was the first Chinese woman to live with Cixi and observe her and then write about what it was like; if many of Der Ling's recollections smack of the every day minutiae of a court that thrived on details and form, her writings are no less valuable for focusing on them, particularly as life within the Forbidden City and the Summer Palace was a closed book for most people in China, let alone in the rest of the world. Her opinion was that it was misunderstanding of much of what emanated from the throne that created so many of the problems Cixi has been wholly blamed for.

Works

Books
  Two Years in the Forbidden City (1911)      
Old Buddha (1928), with preface by Arthur J. Burks
Kowtow (1929)
Lotos Petals (1930)
Jades and Dragons (1932)
Golden Phoenix (1932)
Imperial Incense (1933)
Son of Heaven (1935)

Magazine pieces
 "White Fox: A Legend of Old China," McCall's Magazine, April 1929
 "The Forbidden City and Broadway," The Saturday Evening Post, September 14, 1929
 "Aviation in China," Flyers, October 1929
 "How China Went Air Minded," Flyers, November 1929
 "Wings for Women," Flyers, December 1929
 "Within the Golden City," The Saturday Evening Post, December 21, 1929
 "A Quiet Day with a Chinese Family," The Mentor, February 1930
 "Lady of the Lotus," The Household Magazine, February 1930
 "Golden Bells," Holland's, September 1930
 "Golden Phoenix," Good Housekeeping, December 1930
 "From Convent to Court," Pictorial Review, January 1931
 "Lustrous Jade," Good Housekeeping, February 1931
 "Beyond All Riches," Good Housekeeping, August 1931
 "The Chu Pao Tai," The Household Magazine, September 1931
 "At the Gate of Kwan Yin," Good Housekeeping, November 1931
 "The Honorable Five Blessings," Good Housekeeping, February 1932
 "America Sends Health to China," Physical Culture, March 1932
 "Pu-yi, The Puppet Emperor of Japan," The Saturday Evening Post, April 30, 1932
 "Singing Kites of Tai Shan," The Household Magazine, August 1932
 "The Kingdom of the Swallows," Good Housekeeping, February 1935

In popular culture 
 The Yu sisters' life in the imperial court was dramatised in the 2006 Chinese television series Princess Der Ling, in which Der Ling was played by Zhang Jingjing. A rather romanticised depiction of Der Ling's life, especially her relationship with Kevin White (based on Thaddeus C. White, portrayed by Jonathan Kos-Read).
 In the 2010 Chinese-Japanese coproduction series , the character Princess Shou An (Madam Zhang) is partially inspired by Princess Der Ling.

See also 
 Charles Yu Hsingling – Der Ling's elder brother

References

Princess Der Ling | Two Years in the Forbidden City 
Princess Der Ling | Two Years in the Forbidden City
Princess Der Ling web site

External links
 
 
 
 Princess Der Ling web site 
 "Imperial Masquerade: The Legend of Princess Der Ling" 

1881 births
1944 deaths
Pedestrian road incident deaths
Qing dynasty historians
Republic of China historians
American people of Manchu descent
Historians from Hubei
American Roman Catholics
Chinese Roman Catholics
Chinese people of American descent
People from Berkeley, California
People from Wuhan
University of California, Berkeley alumni
Education in China
Writers from Wuhan
Chinese ladies-in-waiting
Qing dynasty princesses
Han Chinese Plain White Bannermen
20th-century memoirists
Chinese memoirists